Violet Heming (27 January 1895 – 4 July 1981) was an English stage and screen actress. Her name sometimes appeared as Violet Hemming in newspapers.

Biography
Born Violet Hemming in Leeds, Yorkshire, she was the daughter of Alfred Hemming who appeared in silent films and Mabel Allen. 

Heming began a stage career in 1908, appearing as Carrie Crews in Fluffy Ruffles. She appeared in her first motion picture, a short film for Thanhouser Film Company, in 1910. In 1913, she appeared with George Arliss in the play Disraeli.

In September 1925, Variety reported that Heming would appear in a "playlet" for the De Forest Phonofilm sound-on-film system.

Though Heming appeared in several films and television throughout the decades, she is best remembered as a dependable Broadway star with a long list of theatrical credits.

She died on 4 July 1981.

Partial filmography
The Woman Hater (1910 short)
Tempest and Sunshine (1910 short)
Lena Rivers (1910 short)
The Mermaid (1910)
Paul and Virginia (1910 film)
The Running Fight (1915), extant in the Library of Congress
 The Danger Trail (1917)
The Turn of the Wheel (1918)
The Common Cause (1919)
Everywoman (1919)
The Cost (1920)
 When the Desert Calls (1922)
The Knife (1929 short), made in Fox Movietone
The Man Who Played God (1932)
Almost Married (1932)

References

External links

baby picture; Violet Heming aged 3

1895 births
1981 deaths
Actresses from Leeds
English film actresses
English silent film actresses
20th-century English actresses
British emigrants to the United States